Wohlgebogen Jacob Tersmeden (20 May 1712 – 9 February 1767) was a Swedish nobleman, ironmaster, assessor and member of parliament representing the House of Nobility, and brother of renowned diarist Carl Tersmeden.

Life

Early years 
Jacob Tersmeden was born on 20 May 1712 in Larsbo, Söderbärke, Dalarna, the son of Jacob Tersmeden and Elisabeth Gangia. 
He was brought up on his father's estate close to Söderbärke.

Education 
Tersmeden started to study at Uppsala University, aged eight, in 1720. He was enrolled as a student at the Swedish Board of Mines, aged sixteen, to study mineralogy. Instead of continuing studying sciences, he started to shoulder administrative tasks at Larsbo bruk.

Career 
Tersmeden served as ironmaster to Ramnäs. After he had suddenly passed in 1767, his wife Magdalena Elisabeth Söderhielm, shouldered the role as ironmaster.

Politics 
Tersmeden was member of parliament in 1755–1756, he did so as the head of the Tersmeden's, serving the interests of his noble family in the assembly of the feudal estates of Sweden. In 1760–1762, his younger brother, Carl, shouldered the role as representant of the Tersmeden's at the riksdag.

Personal life

Marriage 
On 22 September 1743 Tersmeden married Magdalena Elisabeth Söderhielm, also known as Lona Lisa, at World Heritage Site Engelsberg Ironworks.

Tersmeden's and Söderhielm's first child, Maria Elisabeth, was born in 1744.

Tersmeden is a direct ancestor of the Hereditary Princess of Liechtenstein, Princess Augusta of Eulenburg and Hertefeld and resistance fighter Libertas Schulze-Boysen.

Death 
Tersmeden died on 9 February 1767, aged 54, in Hedemora. He was buried on 3 March in the Tersmeden grave choir at Söderbärke Church.

References

External links 

 Tersmeden's funeral oration

1712 births
1767 deaths
Members of the Riksdag
Swedish ironmasters
Swedish people of German descent
Uppsala University alumni
Swedish mineralogists
18th-century Swedish politicians
18th-century Swedish businesspeople
Swedish nobility
People from Dalarna
Jacob